Blackhawk High School is a public high school in Chippewa Township, Pennsylvania, United States, with a mailing address for nearby Beaver Falls. It is the only high school in the Blackhawk School District. Athletic teams compete as the Blackhawk Cougars in the Western Pennsylvania Interscholastic Athletic League.

Demographics
According to the Pennsylvania Department of Education, Blackhawk High School reported an enrollment of 733 pupils in grades 9th through 12th, with 25.7% of pupils being regarded as economically disadvantaged. 
The school’s student population is 93.6% White, 0.7% Black, 0.3% Asian, 0.1% American Indian or Alaska Native, 1.8% Hispanic, and 3.6% are from two ore more races.

Extracurriculars
The district offers a variety of clubs, activities and sports. Having a rich athletic tradition, the school offers multiple sports, including wrestling, golf, soccer, football, baseball, softball, volleyball, swimming, tennis, lacrosse, hockey, and track and field. It has a Football Mother's Club as well as a Quarterback Club. Blackhawk offers multiple opportunities for the musically talented.  In the 2011 season, the Blackhawk men's varsity soccer team went undefeated for the first time, finishing with a record of 16-0-1, and defeating archrival, Beaver, in the last game of the regular season for the section title.  There is an orchestra, concert band, PIMBA championship winning marching band, competitive marching band, jazz band, pit orchestra for the musicals and plays, and indoor competitions consisting of indoor percussion competition and indoor color guard performances for the winter months.  BHS also offers the Music Academy for students considering a professional job in the realm of music.  These students have the opportunity to take more music related classes instead of academic classes and includes extra band classes. The music academy requires no higher academic achievement but does allow for less state required classes. Blackhawk High School has a proud history, beginning as a merger of the larger Darlington Area School District, which dated back to the early 1920s as having a reputation in excellence, both on the athletic fields and in the classroom. Blackhawk High School also has a wealth of alumni that have gone on to greatness, and has a high legacy retention rate, allowing for a family friendly atmosphere of familiarity and comfort for its students. BHS is located in a scenic, rural space; surrounded by heavily wooded areas and fields of golden wheat, each morning, the sun rises over the hills to greet coming students. Football games are played on a new field located at the rear of the high school.

Notable alumni
Greg Best, football player
Dante Calabria, basketball player
Clayton Hamilton, baseball player
Brian Omogrosso, baseball player
Brendan McKay, baseball player
Archie Miller, basketball player and coach
Sean Miller, basketball player and coach
Adam Liberatore, baseball player
Andrew Havranek, journalist

References

External links
School website

Public high schools in Pennsylvania
Schools in Beaver County, Pennsylvania
Educational institutions established in 1973
1973 establishments in Pennsylvania